Other People's Lives is the second studio album by English Singer-songwriter Ray Davies. It reached the top 40 in the UK Albums Chart in February 2006, and 122 in the US Billboard 200. Released on V2 Records it was Davies' third solo album, but his first straightforward studio release.

Track listing
All tracks composed by Ray Davies
"Things Are Gonna Change (The Morning After)"
"After The Fall"
"Next Door Neighbour"
"All She Wrote"
"Creatures of Little Faith"
"Run Away From Time"
"The Tourist"
"Is There Life After Breakfast?"
"The Getaway (Lonesome Train)"
"Other People's Lives"
"Stand Up Comic"
"Over My Head"
"Thanksgiving Day"

Promotional singles were distributed to radio for the tracks "Things Are Gonna Change (The Morning After)" and "Over my Head". No singles have been commercially released.

The title song appeared in the radio program This American Life episode 344: "The Competition".

Personnel
Ray Davies - guitar, piano, Mellotron, Hammond organ, Vox organ, bass, vocals
Mark Johns - guitar, dobro, slide guitar, E-bow
Steve Bolton - guitar
Dick Nolan, Norman Watt-Roy, David Swift - bass
Dylan Howe, Toby Baron - drums
John Beecham, Mike Cotton, Nick Payn - horn section on "Next Door Neighbor"
Phil Veacock - saxophone on "Stand Up Comic"
Matt Winch - trumpet on "Thanksgiving Day"
Milton McDonald - guitar on "Thanksgiving Day"
Serge Krebs - SFX effects and loops on "The Tourist"
Isabel Fructuoso - vocals on "Other People's Lives"
Alida Giusti, Dick Nolan, Linda McBride, Martin Davies, Martin Rex, Serge Krebs - Konk choir on "Stand Up Comic"
Technical
Laurie Latham, Graham Dominy - engineer

References

External links
The Official Ray Davies Website

2006 albums
Ray Davies albums
V2 Records albums
Albums produced by Ray Davies